The  is an electric multiple unit (EMU) train type operated by Shikoku Railway Company (JR Shikoku) in Shikoku, Japan, since November 1990.

Operations
The sets are based at Takamatsu and Matsuyama depots, and operate on the Yosan Line and Dosan Line. The 7000 series can operate as single-car sets, but the 7100 subseries is single-ended, and must be operated coupled with another 7000 series unit. The sets are designed for use on wanman driver only operation services.

Formations
As of 1 April 2012, the fleet consists of 25 7000 series motored cars and 11 7100 series trailer cars.

The "cMc" (7000 series) cars are fitted with one S-PS58 lozenge-type pantograph. The "Tc" (7100 series) trailer cars have no pantographs and can not operate alone.

Interior
Seating accommodation consists of longitudinal bench seating on one side and transverse seating on the other side of each car, in a similar style to the JR Shikoku 1000 series diesel units.

Bogies
The bogies use a bolsterless design based on the standard 205 series EMU bogies, designated S-DT58 for the motored 7000 series cars, and S-TR58 for the trailer 7100 series cars.

History
The 7000 series trains were first introduced from 21 November 1990.

References

External links

 7000 series information (JR Shikoku) 

Electric multiple units of Japan
7000 series
Train-related introductions in 1990
1500 V DC multiple units of Japan